SM UB-106 was a German Type UB III submarine or U-boat in the German Imperial Navy during World War I. She was commissioned into the German Imperial Navy on 7 February 1918 as SM UB-104.

UB-106 was lost in an accident on 15 March 1918, but was later raised and recommissioned. She was surrendered to the Allies at Harwich on 26 November 1918. After passing into British hands, UB-97 was towed to Falmouth along with five other U-boats  for use in a series of explosive test trials by the Royal Navy in Falmouth Bay, in order to find weaknesses in their design. Following her use during 13/17 January 1921, UB-106 was dumped on Castle Beach and sold to R. Roskelly & Rodgers on 19 April 1921 for scrap (for £125), and partially salvaged over the following decades, although parts remain in situ.

Construction

She was built by Blohm & Voss of Hamburg and following just under a year of construction, launched at Hamburg on 21 July 1917. UB-106 was commissioned early the next year under the command of Oblt.z.S. Hugo Thielmann. Like all Type UB III submarines, UB-106 carried 10 torpedoes and was armed with a  deck gun. UB-106 had a displacement of  while surfaced and  when submerged. Her engines enabled her to travel at  when surfaced and  when submerged.

References

Notes

Citations

Bibliography 

 

German Type UB III submarines
World War I submarines of Germany
U-boats commissioned in 1918
1917 ships
Ships built in Hamburg
Maritime incidents in 1918
U-boats sunk in 1918
U-boat lost in diving accidents